The Tripura Football Association (abbreviated Tripura FA) is one of the 37 Indian state football associations that are affiliated to the All India Football Federation. The Tripura FA administers state tier football in the state of Tripura.

Background 
Tripura Football Association, commonly referred to as Tripura FA, is the governing body for football in the state of Tripura. It is based in Agartala and the association's president is Ratan Saha.

Chandra Memorial League

Chandra Memorial League clubs
The top 25 clubs listed below  administered by the Tripura FA. 

 Forward Club
 Ananda Vaban
 Birendra Club
 Blood Mouth Club
 Ageya Chalo Sangha
 Friends Union
 Jewels Association
 Kalyan Samity
 Lalbahadur Vyamagar
 Mouchak Club
 Nine Bullets
 Noboday Sangha
 Ramakrishna Club
 Sabuj Sangha
 SAI SAG
 Skylark Club
 Soroj Sangha
 Town Club
 Tripura Police
 Tripura Sports School
 Umakanta SAI
 United BST
 Vivekananda Club
 Youth Club
 Shunali shivier club

References

External links
https://khelnow.com/football/governingbody/tripura-football-association
https://tripurainfo.com/TripuraNews/Tripura-yet-again-champion-in-national-under-17-football-championship-Achai-Jamatya-scores-clinching-goal5523.html
https://www.tripuraindia.in/update/index/second-division-league-football-ramkrshina-club-starts-with-win

Football governing bodies in India
Football in Tripura
1968 establishments in Tripura
Sports organizations established in 1968